Justin Lin (born October 11, 1971) is a Taiwanese-American film director. His films have grossed US$2.3 billion worldwide as of March 2017. He is best known for his directorial work on Better Luck Tomorrow (2002), the Fast & Furious franchise from The Fast and the Furious: Tokyo Drift (2006) to Fast & Furious 6 (2013) and F9 (2021), and Star Trek Beyond (2016). He is also known for his work on television programs like Community, and the second season of True Detective.

Early life and education
Lin was born on October 11, 1971, in Taipei, Taiwan. He immigrated to the United States at the age of eight and grew up in Buena Park, California. He graduated from nearby Cypress High School.  Lin earned the rank of Eagle Scout in March 1989 while a member of Boy Scout Troop 670.

Lin attended the University of California, San Diego, for two years before transferring to the University of California, Los Angeles (UCLA). He received a Bachelor of Arts with a major in film and television and a Master of Fine Arts in film directing and production from the UCLA School of Theater, Film and Television. He was given a Distinguished Alumni Award in 2017.

Career

Film work

1997–2005: Better Luck Tomorrow, Annapolis
Lin's first feature film was Shopping for Fangs (1997), which he co-directed with fellow UCLA Film School alumnus Quentin Lee when they were still at UCLA. The film stars John Cho and is considered to be a "cult classic" among independent Asian American films.

Lin wrote and directed a documentary, Crossover (2000), which focused on the 70-year-old phenomenon of the Japanese American Basketball Leagues, which were established in the 1930s.

Lin's solo directorial debut was Better Luck Tomorrow (2002), a film focusing on a circle of high-school-age Asian-Americans who become caught up in a cascading series of petty and then serious crimes. The film premiered at the Sundance Film Festival of that year, and in a question and answer session following a festival screening, Roger Ebert stood up and angrily responded to an audience member asking Lin if he thought it irresponsible to portray Asian-Americans in a negative light, saying, "[N]obody would say to a bunch of white filmmakers, 'How could you do this to your people?' ... Asian-American characters have the right to be whoever the hell they want to be. They do not have to 'represent' their people." Ebert's approval of the film drew the attention of major studios, eventually leading to MTV Films buying the film for distribution, MTV Films' first such acquisition. Better Luck Tomorrow was also an official selection of the 2002 Toronto International Film Festival, was nominated for a Grand Jury Prize at 2002 Sundance, and was a nominee for the John Cassavetes Award at the 2004 Independent Spirit Awards. Variety magazine named him one of the "Top 10 Directors to Watch" in 2002, citing the film.

Lin's second feature film—and first film to be produced and distributed by a large studio, Touchstone Pictures—was Annapolis (2006), which starred James Franco, Tyrese Gibson, Donnie Wahlberg and Jordana Brewster. The film cost US$26 million to make, but grossed only $17 million worldwide.

2006–2015: Fast & Furious franchise, minor projects

His third feature film, The Fast and the Furious: Tokyo Drift, was released in North American cinemas on June 16, 2006. Despite mixed reviews, Tokyo Drift brought in over US$24 million on its opening weekend; the domestic box office would eventually total $62 million with a further $95 million accruing from the foreign box office, making total gross receipts $158 million. With Tokyo Drift, Lin would begin his run as director of the next three Fast & Furious films, leading the franchise until Furious 7. Lin was initially approached to direct the film after the success of Better Luck Tomorrow at Sundance, and after wrapping his first studio film Annapolis, but wanted some "conditions" met, as the script presented him was about "cars drifting around Buddhist statues and geisha girls." Instead, Lin wanted to make a film about Japan, which was "much more postmodern" as he mentioned, and intended to have a film on a more global scale that went against preconceived stereotypes.

After Tokyo Drift, Lin directed a short film that also premiered at the Sundance Global Short Film Project, La Revolución de Iguodala! (2007), about one individual's message as that individual travels through time and becomes embodied in different races. He also went on to do an independent film, Finishing the Game (2007), a mockumentary on the events surrounding the production of Bruce Lee's final film, Game of Death. It premiered at the 2007 Sundance Film Festival, and was also selected as the opening night film at a variety of North American film festivals, for instance at the 25th San Francisco International Asian American Film Festival.

Lin returned to direct Fast & Furious, the fourth in the film series, which opened on April 3, 2009.  On its first day of release the movie grossed US$30.6 million, and peaked at the top spot of the weekend box office with $71.0 million. The film ultimately grossed $359 million worldwide.

Lin directed the follow-up 2011 film Fast Five, which holds the titles for the highest-grossing opening weekend ever in April (US$84 million), and for any car-oriented film. Fast Five also broke box office records for being the second highest spring opening weekend, and surpassed Fast & Furious (2009) to become the highest-grossing film in the franchise. It grossed over $625 million worldwide, making it number 63 on the all-time worldwide list of highest-grossing films (in unadjusted dollars), and the seventh highest-grossing film of 2011.

Following the success of Fast Five, Lin and his production company Barnstorm Pictures signed a two-year first-look deal with Universal Pictures, the company that owns the Fast and Furious franchise.

Lin continued with its sixth installment, Fast & Furious 6. It became the largest Memorial Day Weekend gross for a Universal Pictures film, setting a record of US$120 million and a worldwide total of $317 million. It also became the highest grossing Universal Pictures film in the UK, with an opening weekend UK gross larger than any other movie in the series. Specifically, the film took more than US$4.4 million on its opening day, the biggest opening day for both the franchise and the studio in that market, the second-highest opening of 2013 (behind Iron Man 3 at $4.7 million), and the highest-grossing film of the day with 54% of the market. In the UK, the film also finished as the number one film of the weekend, taking around $14 million, making it the biggest opening for the franchise and Universal, and for a Vin Diesel or Dwayne Johnson film, and the second-biggest opening weekend of 2013 (again behind Iron Man 3, at around $18 million). The film performed relatively well critically. Metacritic describes it as having "generally favorable reviews", and Rotten Tomatoes reports 75% approval from top critics, and 83% approval from viewers, as of March 2017.

2015–present: Star Trek Beyond
Lin co-wrote and co-produced the China-U.S. action-comedy co-production Hollywood Adventures (2015), starring Huang Xiaoming, Tong Dawei and Zhao Wei.

Lin directed Star Trek Beyond, released in July 2016. The film is the third in the series' feature film reboot.

In October 2017, Lin was confirmed to be returning to the Fast & Furious franchise, directing F9. Originally set for an April 2020 release, the film was ultimately released in June 2021 after several delays due to the COVID-19 pandemic. Lin was then slated to return for the franchise's tenth and eleventh installments but dropped out of directing the two films about a week into production.

Announced film projects
As of April 2012, Variety was reporting that Lin was in talks to direct a feature film adaptation of David Henry Hwang's, play Chinglish.

In August 2012, Deadline was reporting that Lin may possibly direct a film based on the 1992 Los Angeles riots entitled L.A. Riots for Universal Studios, with Brian Grazer producing.

In November 2012, The Hollywood Reporter announced that Lin planned to direct a sci-fi film entitled Hibernation.

At the 2014 Sundance Film Festival, Lin acquired the narrative remake rights to the documentary, The Battered Bastards of Baseball, the adaptation of which he reportedly plans to self-finance and produce through his Perfect Storm banner.

In March 2014, Deadline and others reported Lin as having been slated to helm Times Square, based on The Black List script by Taylor Materne and Jacob Rubin, a crime thriller about "set in the last days of the old Times Square, when it was transitioning from a seedy lawless Midtown Manhattan dump to a family-friendly corporate mecca; in that backdrop, when a secret from his past is unearthed, a young man's loyalties are divided between his neighborhood boss who raised him and the grizzled ex-cop who swore to protect him."

In March 2015, Deadline reported Lin's plans to helm a 3D remake of Shaolin Temple under his banner Perfect Storm Entertainment, which focuses more on projects in China.

In June 2016, Variety announced that producer Steven Paul's SP International Pictures had acquired the rights to produce a live-action English-language feature film remake of the "iconic" manga, Lone Wolf and Cub, in an article where Lin went unmentioned, after a March 2012 announcement that Lin might direct such a film. In July 2016, Lin mentioned that he was re-attached as the director for an adaptation of the manga, and that he plans to have a predominantly Asian cast, saying

In September 2017, it was announced that Lin would be directing and developing a narrative version of the documentary Abacus: Small Enough to Jail by Steve James (Hoop Dreams), who serves as an executive producer on the narrative film, with award-winning playwright and House of Cards writer Kenneth Lin will be responsible for writing the screenplay.

Television work

Lin directed three episodes on the first season of the NBC comedy series Community between 2009 and 2010, which include "Modern Warfare", "Interpretive Dance", and "Introduction to Statistics". For his work on the show, Lin was nominated for two NAACP Image Awards for Outstanding Directing in a Comedy Series. In September 2011, Lin and his production company Barnstorm Pictures signed a first-look deal with Sony Pictures Television, who produced Community.

In October 2013, Deadline announced that Lin would be directing the pilot of Scorpion, a CBS drama produced by Roberto Orci and Alex Kurtzman. The series is about an eccentric genius who leads an international team of super-intelligent experts tasked with guarding against complex threats of the modern age. The pilot would be based on the real life of information technologist Walter O'Brien. In addition to directing the first episode, Lin serves as one of the series executive producers, along with Nick Santora.

Lin directed the first two episodes in 2015 of the second season of True Detective, "The Western Book of the Dead" (S02E01) and "Night Finds You" (S02E02).

In December 2018, Lin signed an overall TV deal with Apple, Inc., departing from his deal with Sony Pictures Television. In the fall of 2020, Lin's Perfect Storm Entertainment signed an overall film and television first look deal with Universal Studios.

Lin also serves as Executive Producer of the series Warrior based on the writings of Bruce Lee.

Other projects
In 2009, Lin started the Asian American blog YOMYOMF which stands for "You Offend Me You Offend My Family." It was adapted into a YouTube channel in 2011.

In 2022, Lin set a joint venture with (art)ificial, the art & tech studio behind the NFT sci-fi collection Galaxy Eggs, with the intention to be the first company to build a Hollywood franchise from original NFT art.

Personal life 
Lin has a son who has made cameos in several of his movies.

Filmography
Feature films

Television

See also

 List of Taiwanese Americans

References

Further reading

External links

 
 

1971 births
Action film directors
American film directors of Taiwanese descent
American people of Chinese descent
American television directors
Artists from Taipei
Film directors from California
Film directors from Taipei
Living people
People from Cypress, California
Taiwanese emigrants to the United States
UCLA Film School alumni
University of California, San Diego alumni